Madison Schuck (born 8 October 1991) is an Australian rugby union player.

Biography 
Schuck was one of eleven players who made their international debut for Australia against Fiji on 6 May 2022 at the Suncorp Stadium in Brisbane. She then started in her second appearance against Japan at the Bond Sports Park in Gold Coast.

Schuck was named in the Wallaroos squad for the 2022 Pacific Four Series. She came off the bench against the Black Ferns in the opening match of the Pacific Four series on 6 June. She was later named in the Wallaroos squad for a two-test series against the Black Ferns at the Laurie O'Reilly Cup.

Schuck was also selected in the Wallaroos side for the delayed 2022 Rugby World Cup in New Zealand.

References

External links
Wallaroos Profile

1991 births
Living people
Australia women's international rugby union players
Australian female rugby union players
21st-century Australian women